Robert Sassone (23 November 1978 – 21 January 2016) was a French racing cyclist. He had cancer and killed himself.

He rode in the men's Madison at the 2000 Summer Olympics. He also rode in the 2002 Vuelta a España, finishing in 129th place. He was banned from cycling for two years in 2004, after testing positive for betamethasone during the Six Days of Nouméa race in New Caledonia.

Death
Sassone was suffering from cancer and killed himself in his native New Caledonia in January 2016, aged 37.

Major results

Road

2001
 8th Overall Circuit des Mines
1st Stages 4 & 8
2002
 1st Stage 3 Tour du Limousin
2003
 1st Stage 2 Tour du Poitou-Charentes
 3rd Kampioenschap van Vlaanderen

Track

1996
 3rd Six Days of Nouméa (with Jean-Michel Tessier)
1997
 2nd Six Days of Nouméa (with Jean-Michel Tessier)
1998
 1st Six Days of Nouméa (with Jean-Michel Tessier)
1999
 1st  Madison, UEC European Track Championships (with Damien Pommereau)
 1st Six Days of Nouméa (with Christian Pierron)
2000
 National Track Championships
1st  Madison (with Damien Pommereau)
1st  Team pursuit (with Francis Moreau, Philippe Gaumont and Damien Pommereau)
2001
 1st  Madison, UCI World Track Championships (with Jérôme Neuville)
 National Track Championships
1st  Points race
1st  Madison (with Jean-Michel Tessier)
 1st Six Days of Nouméa (with Jean-Michel Tessier)
 UCI World Cup
1st Team pursuit, Mexico
3rd Team pursuit, Cali
2002
 1st  Madison, National Track Championships (with Jean-Michel Tessier)
2003
 1st Six Days of Nouméa (with Jean-Michel Tessier)
 2nd Scratch, UCI World Track Championships
 3rd Madison, National Track Championships

References

External links
 

1978 births
2016 suicides
People from Nouméa
French male cyclists
New Caledonian male cyclists
Olympic cyclists of France
Cyclists at the 2000 Summer Olympics
French sportspeople in doping cases
Doping cases in cycling
Suicides in New Caledonia